The Plenary Councils of Baltimore were three national meetings of Catholic bishops in the United States in 1852, 1866 and 1884 in Baltimore, Maryland.

During the early history of the Roman Catholic Church in the United States all of the dioceses were part of one ecclesiastical province under the Archbishop of Baltimore.  This being the case, governance of the American church was carried out by provincial councils held in Baltimore.  As the church grew and was divided into multiple provinces, it became necessary for a national (or plenary) council of the bishops of the United States to meet to foster common discipline.

The fathers of the Seventh Provincial Council of Baltimore requested the Holy See to sanction the holding of a plenary council. The petition was granted and the pope appointed Archbishop Francis Kenrick of Baltimore as apostolic delegate to convene and preside over the council.

First Plenary Council of Baltimore (1852)
The First Plenary Council of Baltimore was solemnly opened on 9 May 1852. Its sessions were attended by six archbishops and thirty-five suffragan bishops. The Bishop of Monterey, California, Joseph Sadoc Alemany, was also present, although his diocese, lately separated from Mexico, had not yet been incorporated with any American province. Another prelate in attendance was Armand de Charbonnel, the Bishop of Toronto, Canada. The religious orders and congregations were represented by the Mitred Abbot of St. Mary of La Trappe and by the superiors of the Augustinians, Dominicans, Benedictines, Franciscans, Jesuits, Redemptorists, Vincentians, and Sulpicians. The last solemn session was held on 20 May.

Second Plenary Council of Baltimore (1866)
The Second Plenary Council was presided over by Archbishop Spalding of Baltimore as Delegate Apostolic. It was opened on 7 October and closed on 21 October 1866. The acts note that, at the last solemn session, Andrew Johnson, President of the United States, was among the auditors. The decrees of this council were signed by seven archbishops, thirty-nine bishops or their procurators, and two abbots. The decrees are divided into fourteen titles and subdivided into chapters. They were approved by Pope Pius IX.

Third Plenary Council of Baltimore (1884)
The Third Plenary Council was presided over by the apostolic delegate, Archbishop James Gibbons of Baltimore. Its decrees were signed by fourteen archbishops, sixty-one bishops or their representatives, six abbots, and one general of a religious congregation. The first solemn session was held 9 November, and the last 7 December 1884. Its decrees are divided into twelve titles, approved by Pope Leo XIII.

Excommunications of the Third Council
Title iv established two excommunications latae sententiae that were applicable only to Catholics within the United States.  The first (n. 124) applied to American Catholics who, after obtaining a civil divorce, attempted remarriage. This excommunication was lifted (retroactively) in 1977 by Pope Paul VI at the request of the National Conference of Catholic Bishops.

The second excommunication (n. 127) applied to American Catholics who married (or attempted marriage) before a non-Catholic minister. This excommunication was later complemented by canon 2319 of the 1917 Code of Canon Law, which in turn was modified in 1953 to subsume the U.S.-only excommunication. The excommunication of canon 2319 was subsequently lifted (retroactively) by Pope Paul VI in the 1970 motu proprio Matrimonia Mixta.

See also

 History of Catholic education in the United States
 History of Roman Catholicism in the United States
 Seton Hall University, a college founded because of the subject

References

Sources

Further reading
 Cassidy, Francis P. "Catholic Education in the Third Plenary Council of Baltimore. I." Catholic Historical Review (1948): 257-305. in JSTOR
 Catholic Church.  Acta et decreta Concilii plenarii Baltimorensis tertii. A.D. MDCCCLXXXIV. Baltimore: Typis Johannis Murphy et Sociorum, 1886. in OpenLibrary
 Gleason, Philip, et al. "Baltimore III and education." US Catholic Historian (1985): 273-313. in JSTOR

External links
Roman Catholic Archdiocese of Baltimore

19th-century Catholic Church councils
Baltimore, Plenary Councils of
History of Catholicism in the United States
Pope Leo XIII
History of Baltimore
1852 in the United States
1866 in the United States
1884 in the United States
1852 in Christianity
1866 in Christianity
1884 in Christianity
1852 conferences
1868 conferences
1884 conferences
African-American Roman Catholicism